The discography of Australian recording artist and DJ Havana Brown consists of one studio album, fourteen compilation albums, one extended play, twenty-one singles (three as a featured artist) and eleven music videos. Brown, originally a DJ, began performing at small venues around Melbourne and worked with promoters around Australia in her early 20s. In 2008, she was approached by Island Records Australia to see if she was interested in creating compilation albums for the label. Brown has since produced nine albums in a series entitled, Crave, which have all charted within the ARIA Compilation Albums Chart top ten.

In April 2011, Brown released her debut single "We Run the Night", which peaked at number five on the ARIA Singles Chart and was certified triple platinum by the Australian Recording Industry Association (ARIA), for selling 210,000 copies. In September 2011, Brown signed with Universal Republic Records via producer RedOne's label 2101 Records. "We Run the Night" was later remixed by the producer and featured guest vocals by American rapper Pitbull. In the United States, the remix peaked at number 26 on the Billboard Hot 100 chart, and number one on the Hot Dance Club Songs chart. Brown's debut EP When the Lights Go Out was released in July 2012, which contains five songs.

Albums

Studio albums

Compilation albums

Extended plays

Singles

As lead artist

As featured artist

Promotional singles

Other appearances

Music videos

As lead artist

As featured artist

Notes

References

Discographies of Australian artists
Pop music discographies